St George's C of E Foundation School, often abbreviated to St George's, is an all-through school in Broadstairs, Kent, catering for students for 4 to 19 years (primary and through secondary). The official school as it currently stands was formed in the mid-1970s by joining the two old schools of St George's Boys School and St George's Girls C of E School (founded 1841) together into one building and formed the current St George's community.

History

Moving to Broadstairs
The original St George's School opened in Ramsgate in 1841. In September 1967, St George's Girls C of E School moved from Ramsgate to a new building in Broadstairs near Dane Court Grammar School, with St George's Boys School moving to the site in 1973, after the construction of more facilities.  By 1975 it was officially a unisex School called St George's C of E School, and later became a Business and an Enterprise school. The 1960s and 1970s buildings stood until early 2010, when it was knocked down and a new school building was built next to the site. On 25 July 2004, Irish vocal pop band Westlife held a concert for their Turnaround Tour supporting their album Turnaround. On 31 July 2004, Busted (band) and McFly played on the school field. Other artists who have played at the school include Atomic Kitten and Status Quo (band).

House System
As of 2013 the school has 4 House Learning Communities, each named after a Cathedral City 

Houses - all have house colour on tie
 Canterbury - Blue
 Exeter - Orange
 Rochester - Red
 Salisbury - Purple

Inter House Challenge
In the Inter House Challenge students from the above 'House Learning Communities' compete with students from other Houses in a series of challenges, such as Sport, Art, Science, and other activities to win points for their House. The House with the most points wins the Inter House Cup at the end of each academic year. These events happen at the end of every term, and the points carry over through the school year, until making a final end-of-year total.

Rochester dominated the 1990s, and Exeter the early 2000s.  In recent years, all Houses have won the Challenge Cup.

The new building

The project
The new school building plan was formed by the previous principal Keith Rumblo, with his Deputy Head and future Principal Kim Stoner, and members of the school governing body. The plan was to build the first 21st-century facilities in Thanet, as part of the Government's 'Building Schools for the Future' scheme. It cost about £23M, with state-of-the-art facilities and modern equipment in all areas.  The old buildings were almost entirely demolished.

Moving into the building
Although the school wasn't officially opened until September 2010, staff moved in on 20 April 2010, Year 11 and Sixth Form on 21 April, Years 9 and 10 on the 22nd and Years 7 and 8  came in on the 22nd.

Primary school
Due to the demand for a new primary school in the Thanet area, St George's received funding to build a new primary phase to open in September 2016. This was the first time that the school had a Primary Section since 1925. The Head of School is Mrs Wreford, working with Primary Deputy Head Mrs Curry, along with Mr Mirams, and the rest of the SLT. From September, all year groups will be filled, making St George's truly an all-through school.

Head Teachers
Norman Morland 1973-1988 who joined the school from The Charles Dickens School to oversee the merger of the boys' and girls' schools.  He left at Easter 1988 and the school was overseen by Alistair Hogarth for the Summer Term

John Fletcher 1988-1996.  Mr Fletcher joined the school from King Ethelbert School and was also a J.P.

Keith Rumblo 1996–2009 served the school as its Head for 13 out of his 19 years there, having also joined from King Ethelbert School. He started the new school plan.

Kim Stoner 2009–2017 created a 'mantra' for students that "Nothing but our best will do". Since Easter 2009, she oversaw :

 A large improvement in GCSE results.  On 17 January, the school site published a letter from Nick Gibb, M.P. saying that St. George's Church of England Foundation School was amongst the 100 top performing schools, based on sustained improvement in each year from 2007 to 2010
 New school buildings being built and the old 1960s structures knocked down, something that had been put in motion by Mr Rumblo  
 Restructuring the House System with the 8 Heads of Houses replaced with 5 Heads of Year assisted by Year Support staff, along with a 6th Form team. The 8 Houses were also reduced to 4.
 Plans were then made for a primary school to be added in the school grounds, and the age-range of St George's Church of England Foundation School to change from 11-19 to 4-19 and enlarge the school by adding a 2 Form Entry primary provision.
In October 2015, at the request of the Local Authority, Mrs Stoner became interim executive headteacher of The Charles Dickens School for the 2015/2016 school year. This followed on from her successful interim lead of St Edmund's Catholic School, Dover in 2013.

Adam Mirams 2017- present-
After Mrs Stoner retired in 2017. Mr Mirams became Head Teacher, having been Deputy Head for Mrs Stoner's tenure.

Notable Former Pupils 
Sid Gueran, Footballer

Sir William Jordan, Former High Commissioner for New Zealand

Hannen Swaffer, Journalist

Tina Louise Germaine, Actress

David Lee Stone, Author

References

Secondary schools in Kent
Church of England secondary schools in the Diocese of Canterbury
Foundation schools in Kent
Broadstairs
Primary schools in Kent